Blue Coast Records was founded by producer/engineer Cookie Marenco and French engineer Jean Claude Reynaud in 2007. The label is known for using the Direct Stream Digital hi-resolution format, using the labels’ proprietary recording technique Extended Sound Environment (E.S.E.). Artists include Kai Eckhardt, Tony Furtado, Rob Ickes, and others. The label is closely associated with OTR Studios, a recording studio located on the San Francisco Peninsula.

History
Blue Coast Records was founded by producer/engineer Cookie Marenco and French engineer Jean Claude Reynaud in 2007. The first record from Blue Coast Records, Blue Coast Collection, was released in an SACD format. Marenco also founded OTR Studios, a recording studio located on the San Francisco Peninsula. OTR also serves as the home base for Blue Coast Records.

Format
The label is known for their 96k and DSD hi-resolution downloads and their monthly special events, where they record musicians live and hours later make the music available for download. Most of their recordings are done using 2" analog tape, and using the labels’ proprietary recording technique Extended Sound Environment (E.S.E.). Releases are always recorded in the studio without the use of headphones, overdubs or digital effects.

Artists 
The following artists are on the label as of November 2013.

José Manuel Blanco
Brain
Garett Brennan
John R. Burr
Marco de Carvalho
Chi McClean
City Folk
Kai Eckhardt
Tony Furtado
Alex de Grassi
Keith Greeninger
Fiona Joy Hawkins
Rob Ickes
Houston Jones
Valerie Joyce
Dayan Kai
Chris Kee
Art Lande
Jenna Mammina
Jason McGuire
Glen Moore
Luis Perez
 Simone Raoux (former)
Jane Selkye
Christie Winn

See also
Direct Stream Digital

References

External links 
 Blue Coast Records Official Site 
 OTR Studios Official Site 
 Cookie Marenco Official Site

 
Recording studios owned by women